Arkadij Naiditsch (born 25 October 1985) is an Azerbaijani (since 2015) chess grandmaster who previously represented Latvia (until 2005) and Germany (2005–2015).

Career

In 1995 he won the European Under-10 championship in Verdun.

Naiditsch was the winner of the Dortmund Sparkassen 2005 Tournament, ahead of higher-rated and well-known players such as Loek van Wely, Veselin Topalov, Peter Svidler, Vladimir Kramnik, Michael Adams, and Peter Leko. In 2007, he won the German national championship based in Bad Königshofen.

In 2011 he won the 15th International Neckar Open with a score of 8½/9. This achievement enabled him to cross the 2700 Elo rating mark. In the same year Naiditsch played on the top board for the German team that won the gold medal at the European Team Chess Championship in Porto Carras.

Naiditsch won the Grandmaster Group B of the Tata Steel Chess Tournament 2013 in Wijk aan Zee on tiebreak over Richárd Rapport after both finished on 9/13. This victory qualified him for the Tata Steel Group A of 2014 (later renamed 'Tata Steel Masters').
In August 2014 he won with the black pieces against World Champion Magnus Carlsen, playing first board for the German team in the 41st Chess Olympiad in Tromsø. The following month Naiditsch won the 2nd Grenke Chess Classic tournament in Baden-Baden. In December of the same year, he finished first in the 38th Zurich Christmas Open.

In January 2015 he tied for 1st–5th with Alexander Donchenko, Eduardo Iturrizaga, Matthias Dann and Miloš Pavlović in the Masters section of the Basel Chess Festival, winning the tournament on best tiebreak score.
Naiditsch tied for first with Magnus Carlsen in the 3rd Grenke Chess Classic in February 2015, finishing second after a five-game blitz playoff, which ended with an armageddon game.

In July 2015 he switched to the Azerbaijani Chess Federation. On 30 December 2015 Naiditsch won for the second consecutive year the Zurich Christmas Open. Six days later, he won also the Basel Chess Festival for the second year in a row.

Personal life
In October 2014, Naiditsch married Ukrainian-Israeli chess player IM Yuliya Shvayger. He currently lives in Baku with his family.

References

External links
 
 
 
 
 Arkadij Naiditsch chess games and profile at Chess-DB.com

1985 births
Living people
Chess grandmasters
Chess Olympiad competitors
German chess players
Latvian chess players
Azerbaijani chess players
Latvian emigrants to Germany
Naturalized citizens of Germany
Naturalized citizens of Azerbaijan
Sportspeople from Riga